The 84th Military Airlift Squadron is an inactive United States Air Force unit. Its last assignment was to the 60th Military Airlift Wing, Military Airlift Command, stationed at Travis Air Force Base, California.

It was inactivated on 1 July 1971.

History

Activated under the Alaskan Wing, Air Transport Command in March 1943 at Edmonton Airport, Alberta, Canada; it provided support for transient lend-lease aircraft bound for the Soviet Union during 1943, as well as Eleventh Air Force aircraft which were to be used during the Aleutian Campaign.

The squadron was re-activated at Great Falls AFB, Montana in 1952 under Military Air Transport Service. It operated C-54 Skymasters until MATS shut down operations at Great Falls. It moved to Travis AFB in 1953, where it was equipped with long range C-124 Globemaster II intercontinental transports. The unit flew worldwide strategic transport missions under the Western Transport Air Force. It was re-equipped with the C-133B Cargomaster very heavy strategic transport aircraft in 1958, and continued worldwide transport operations until July 1971 when the C-133s were retired.

Lineage
 Established as the 84th Ferrying Squadron and activated on 25 March 1943
 Re-designated as the 84th Transport Squadron on 26 March 1943
 Inactivated on 20 September 1943
 Disbanded on 8 October 1948
 Reconstituted as the 84th Air Transport Squadron (Medium)  and activated on 20 January 1952
 Re-designated as the 84th Air Transport Squadron, Heavy on 16 May 1953
 Re-designated as the 84th Military Airlift Squadron on 8 January 1966
 Inactivated on 1 July 1971

Assignments
 1452d Army Air Force Base Unit, 25 March-20 September 1943
 1701st Air Transport Wing, 20 July 1952
 1501st Air Transport Wing, 16 May 1953
 60th Military Airlift Wing, 8 January 1966– 1 July 1971

Stations
 Edmonton Airport, Alberta, Canada, 25 March-20 September 1943
 Great Falls AFB, Montana, 20 Jul 1952
 Travis AFB, California, 16 May 1953 – 1 July 1971

Aircraft
 Transient lend-lease aircraft on Alaska Transport Route, 1943
 C-54 Skymaster, 1952–1953
 C-124 Globemaster II, 1953–1958
 C-133 Cargomaster, 1957–1971

References

 Mueller, Robert, Air Force Bases Volume I, Active Air Force Bases Within the United States of America on 17 September 1982, Office of Air Force History, 1989
 Remembering an Unsung Giant The Douglas C-133 Cargomaster and Its People
 AFHRA document search

084
Military units and formations in California